The 1958 Cal Poly Mustangs football team represented California Polytechnic State College—now known as California Polytechnic State University, San Luis Obispo—as a member of the California Collegiate Athletic Association (CCAA) during the 1958 NCAA College Division football season. Led by ninth-year head coach LeRoy Hughes, Cal Poly compiled an overall record of 9–1 with a mark of 4–1 in conference play. The Mustangs tied with Fresno State for the best record in the CCAA, but Fresno State was awarded the championship because they defeated Cal Poly head-to-head. The team outscored its opponents 321 to 60 for the season. The Mustangs played home games at Mustang Stadium in San Luis Obispo, California.

Schedule

References

Cal Poly
Cal Poly Mustangs football seasons
Cal Poly Mustangs football